Disney Studio 1 is the largest building and attraction located in the Walt Disney Studios Park in Disneyland Paris. Guests entering the park must walk through the building to have access to the remainder of the park. The interior is a reconstruction of a street in Hollywood.

The right side of the building features six facades based on various Hollywood buildings, both real and fictional, from the 1920s to 1960s: Schwab's Pharmacy, The Brown Derby, Club Swankedero, The Gunga Den, The Hep Cat Club, and The Liki Tiki. Behind these facades lies the Restaurant en Coulisse, a fast-food restaurant.

The left side features six facades of fictional retail buildings, including: Shutterbugs, Glamour Girl Cosmetics, The Alexandria Theater, Hollywood and Vine Five & Dime, The Gossip Column, and Last Chance Gas. The Legends of Hollywood boutique-store can be found behind them.

On July 5, 2003, the Shutterbugs building facade was turned into an actual working photo studio.

See also
 Front Lot

References

External links
 Disney Studio 1 page on Disneyland Resort Paris' official website

Amusement rides introduced in 2002
Walt Disney Parks and Resorts attractions
Walt Disney Studios Park
Front Lot
2002 establishments in France